Bishop of Toronto may refer to:

 the bishop of the Anglican Diocese of Toronto
 the archbishop of the Roman Catholic Archdiocese of Toronto; see List of Roman Catholic archbishops of Toronto
 the metropolitan of the Greek Orthodox Archdiocese of Canada
 the bishop of the Eparchy of Toronto and Eastern Canada
 the archbishop of the Ukrainian Orthodox Eparchy of Eastern Canada